Tembrungharta is a village in the Dang district of Gujarat, India, and is located on the road connecting the Dang district headquarters Ahwa and the Saputara hill station.

References

Villages in Dang district, India